Russ is a masculine given name and a surname. It may also refer to:

 Russ, an obsolete name for Russians or Muscovites
 Russ (rapper), American rapper
 Russ Millions, British rapper formerly known solely as Russ
 Russ (Norwegian celebrant), participant(s) in the traditional Norwegian high school graduation ceremony russefeiring
 Russ, Bas-Rhin, a commune in Alsace, France
 Russ, Missouri, a community in the United States
 Russ, Hungarian name for Ruşi village, Bretea Română Commune, Hunedoara County, Romania
 Gotland pony or russ, a breed of Swedish pony
 Russ Prize, awarded by the United States National Academy of Engineering from 2001 to 2011
 Russ, a quasi-virus advertisement for Virus: The Game